Mag TV Na was the brand of regional talk or magazine shows (as the title suggests) of different ABS-CBN Regional stations in the Philippines. There were some versions of MAG TV Na use magazine-like graphics. An example is a video squeezed into a page of a magazine. 
The Mag TV Na family of programs were not available in the Metro Manila market.

After 10 years of airing, Mag TV Na made its final broadcast as part of cost-cutting measures in preparation of ABS-CBN Regional's digitalization to align with Manila's flagship television station after Kapamilya, Mas Winner Ka! (ended on June 23 in Bacolod and ended on June 30 in Cebu and Davao), Agri Tayo Dito and regional editions of TV Patrol (which also made their final broadcasts on June 29).

List of MAG TV Na programs (final)
 MAG TV Na, Atin 'To! (Baguio)
 MAG TV Na, Oragon! (Naga) 
 MAG TV Na, Amiga! (Bacolod)
 MAG TV Na! (Cebu)
 MAG TV De Aton Este! (Zamboanga)
 MAG TV Na, Asenso Ta! (Cagayan de Oro)
 MAG TV Na! Southern Mindanao (Davao)

Defunct Mag TV Na program
 MAG TV Na, Waraynon! (Tacloban)

NOTE: MAG TV Na, Waraynon was cancelled in 2015 and was replaced by the Cebuano edition.

Mag TV Na areas

Luzon
MAG TV Na, Atin To!
Baguio (station-produced)
Laoag
Vigan
Tuguegarao
Isabela
Dagupan
Olongapo
Pampanga
San Pablo 
Batangas
Lucena
Palawan
MAG TV Na, Oragon!
Daet
Naga (station-produced)
Legazpi

Visayas
MAG TV Na, Amiga!
Kalibo
Roxas
Iloilo
Bacolod (station-produced)
MAG TV Na!
Dumaguete
Cebu (station-produced)
Bohol
Tacloban

Mindanao
Mag TV, De Aton Este!
Dipolog
Pagadian
Zamboanga (station-produced)
Mag TV Na! Asenso Ta!
Cagayan de Oro (station-produced)
Iligan
Butuan
MAG TV Na! Southern Mindanao!
Davao (station-produced)
General Santos
Koronadal
Cotabato

See also
ABS-CBN Regional Channel

References

External links 
 now.abs-cbn.com

2008 Philippine television series debuts
2018 Philippine television series endings
ABS-CBN Regional shows
Filipino-language television shows